
Year 364 (CCCLXIV) was a leap year starting on Thursday (link will display the full calendar) of the Julian calendar. At the time, it was known as the Year of the Consulship of Augustus and Varronianus (or, less frequently, year 1117 Ab urbe condita). The denomination 364 for this year has been used since the early medieval period, when the Anno Domini calendar era became the prevalent method in Europe for naming years.

Events 
 By place 

 Roman Empire 
 February 17 – Emperor Jovian dies after a reign of eight months. He is found dead in his tent at Tyana (Asia Minor) en route back to Constantinople, in suspicious circumstances.
 February 26 – Valentinian I is proclaimed Emperor by officers of the Roman army at Nicaea in Bithynia. He addresses the soldiers (who threaten to riot) in a speech. He founds the Valentinianic dynasty and rules the Western Roman Empire, from Caledonia (Scotland) to the Rhine frontier, ensuring it a few years of relative security. He settles in Paris and establishes a militia to defend the region.
 March 28 – Valens, brother of Valentinian I, is appointed co-emperor (Augustus) in the palace of Hebdomon (Turkey). He rules the Eastern Roman Empire, from the Danube to the Persian border, and begins the first anti-pagan persecutions.
 Britain is forced to endure fierce barbarian raids.

 By topic 
 Religion 
 The Council of Laodicea decides some disciplinary questions of the church and attempts to establish the Biblical canon, but fails.

 Science 
 Theon of Alexandria, Greek mathematician, observes a solar eclipse (June 16) and a lunar eclipse (November 25). He gains some renown for his version of Euclid's Elements and his commentaries on Ptolemy's Almagest.

Births 
 Blaesilla, Roman noblewoman (d. 384)
 Huiguo, Chinese Buddhist nun (d. 433)
 Sima Daozi, Chinese prince and regent (d. 403)
 Xu Xianzhi, Chinese official and regent (d. 426)

Deaths 
 February 17 – Jovian, Roman emperor (b. 331)
 Ge Hong, Chinese scholar and taoist (b. 283)
 Theophilos the Indian, Christian bishop

References